

Administrative and municipal divisions

See also
Administrative divisions of Evenk Autonomous Okrug
Administrative divisions of Taymyr Autonomous Okrug

References

Krasnoyarsk Krai
Krasnoyarsk Krai